A Tribute to Ryuichi Sakamoto – To the Moon and Back is a tribute album to Japanese multi-genre composer Ryuichi Sakamoto, released November 30, 2022, by Milan Records, two days ahead of its original release date. The album features reworked versions of Sakamoto's songs, referred to as "remodels", by artists including Devonté Hynes, the Cinematic Orchestra, Hildur Guðnadóttir, Alva Noto, and David Sylvian. A single for American bass guitarist Thundercat's version of the song "Thousand Knives", title track to the album of the same name, was released as a single on October 5, 2022. The second single, Electric Youth's take on "Merry Christmas Mr. Lawrence", was released November 16.

Reception 

Pitchforks Philip Sherburne called Alva Noto's rendition of "The Sheltering Sky" "one of the simplest yet most moving pieces" of the album which "represents a captivating fusion of the two men's sensibilities." Sherburne also called other cuts "remarkable", including those from Sylvian, Guðnadóttir, and Fennesz.

Track listing

Personnel 
 Ryuichi Sakamoto – producer
 Lim Giong – producer (1)
 David Sylvian – producer (2)
 Thundercat – producer (3)
 Taylor Graves – producer (3)
 Vic Wainstein – engineer (3)
 Electric Youth – producer (4)
 Cornelius – producer (5)
 Toyoaki Mishima – mixing engineer (5)
 Hildur Guðnadóttir – recording engineer (6)
 Skúli Sverrisson – recording engineer (6)
 Sam Slater – mixing engineer (6)
 Alva Noto – producer (7)
 Fennesz – producer (8)
 Devonté Hynes – producer (9)
 Emily Schubert – vocals, vocal producer (9)
 The Cinematic Orchestra – producer (10)
 Otomo Yoshihide – producer (11)
 404.Zero – producer (13)
 Francesco Fabris – mixing engineer (13)

References 

2022 albums
Ryuichi Sakamoto albums
Milan Records albums
Tribute albums